Creehan Cliff is a cliff about  east-northeast of Richmond Peak on the north side of Toney Mountain in Marie Byrd Land. It was mapped by the United States Geological Survey from ground surveys and from U.S. Navy air photos, 1959–71, and named by the Advisory Committee on Antarctic Names for Lieutenant E. Patrick Creehan, MC, U.S. Navy Reserve, Flight Surgeon of Squadron VXE-6 during Operation Deep Freeze 1971 and 1972.

References 

Cliffs of Marie Byrd Land